The following list is of the episodes in the first series of ITV and CITV television series My Phone Genie, which stars Adam Wadsworth, Bessie Cursons, Haruka Abe, Fox Jackson-Keen, Heather Nicol, Lothaire Gérard and Ethan Hammer.

Episodes

The series first aired on 1 January 2012.

Series 1 (2012)

My Phone Genie